"I Think About Your Lovin'" is a song written by Diana Trask and performed by The Osmond Brothers as the lead single of their 1982 self-titled album.  It reached #17 on the Billboard country music chart in 1982.

"I Think About Your Lovin'" marked the first and highest-charting country music single for the Osmonds, and the first song to be released since the departure of Donny Osmond from the group and its return to the original four-man lineup. The song was produced by Rick Hall, who returned to work with the band after he had produced their early pop work in 1970 and 1971.

References

1982 songs
1982 singles
The Osmonds songs
Elektra Records singles